Cork Boat is a memoir, first published in 2004, written by American author John Pollack. It is a first-person account of his experience designing and building the Cork Boat, a vessel made of exactly 165,321 wine corks.

External links
 On Amazon.com

References

American memoirs